The TOMA is an armored water cannon designed for riot control by Turkish companies Katmerciler, Moğol Makina and Nurol Makina. 

TOMAs are primarily operated by the Turkish National Police and the Turkish Gendarmerie. Following the Gezi Park protests, the Turkish government ordered a total of 73 TOMAs between 2013 and 2014, deploying them to Istanbul, Ankara and southeast Turkey. Following their use by Turkish police in crackdowns on protests in Gezi Park, the TOMA received new export orders to countries such as Brazil, Chile, Kuwait, Libya and Senegal.

Technical specifications

TOMAs can be built onto a range of Mercedes-Benz and Iveco truck chassis configurations, and can reach a top speed of 100 km/h. The heavy armor protects the cab, engine and weapons systems of the TOMA from rioters and gunfire, while also allowing it to achieve a 30% gradient climbing capability. Fire extinguishers are provided to put out fires in both the road and the vehicle, and the crew are protected against tear gas and other irritants breaching the cab.

The TOMA is primarily equipped with a computer-controlled water cannon system, firing pressurised water from two nozzles, with a water tank capacity of up to  that can be filled with water from wells and lakes. The TOMA is also equipped with two  tanks for tear gas and dye, as well as an  foam tank. The foam, tear gas and dye reserves can be fired individually from the nozzles, or can be used in combination with water.

While TOMAs are primarily specified for riot control, they have also been used to water tree saplings planted as a memorial to fallen police officers, clean CBRN equipment, and fight large fires.

Gallery

See also
Wasserwerfer 9000 and Wasserwerfer 10000 - the TOMA's German equivalent

References 

Non-lethal weapons
Police weapons
Riot control weapons
Gendarmerie
Water
Riot control equipment

de:Wasserwerfer#Türkei